11:59 may refer to:

 11:59 (album), by Ryan Star
 "11:59" (Star Trek: Voyager), a 1999 episode of the television series Star Trek: Voyager
 "11:59", a song by Blondie from Parallel Lines
 "Eleven-Fifty-Nine", a 2016 episode of the television series Arrow

See also 
 Confusion at noon and midnight
 Doomsday Clock, frequently positioned at a time close to midnight

Date and time disambiguation pages